Eddyville–Blakesburg–Fremont Community School District (EBFCSD) is a rural public school district headquartered in Eddyville, Iowa.

The district is within Mahaska, Monroe, and Wapello counties, with additional small sections in Davis and Keokuk counties. It serves Eddyville, Blakesburg, Fremont, Chillicothe, and Kirkville.

History
It was formed on July 1, 2012, by the merger of the Fremont Community School District and the Eddyville–Blakesburg Community School District. On Tuesday, September 13, 2011, the merger was approved in a referendum, with the E-B district voters doing so on a 335–86 basis and the Fremont voters doing so on a 91–60 basis. As part of the merger plans, the pre-merger E-B and Fremont boards were to, for a period, continue to meet while a newly selected combined EBF board was to already begin business.

Schools
 Eddyville–Blakesburg–Fremont Junior/Senior High School (Eddyville)
 Blakesburg Elementary School
 Eddyville Elementary School
 Fremont Elementary School

Eddyville–Blakesburg–Fremont Junior/Senior High School

Athletics
The Rockets participate in the South Central Conference in the following sports.
Football
Cross Country
Volleyball
Basketball
Bowling
Wrestling
 2014 Class 1A State Champions 
Golf
Tennis
Track and Field
 Girls' 1993 Class 2A State Champions
Baseball
Softball

See also
List of school districts in Iowa
List of high schools in Iowa

References

External links
 Eddyville-Blakesburg-Fremont Community School District
 "Iowa School District Profiles: Eddyville-Blakesburg-Fremont Community School District." Iowa State University Iowa Community Indicators Program (ICIP), Department of Economics, June 2013.

School districts in Iowa
School districts established in 2012
2012 establishments in Iowa
Education in Davis County, Iowa
Education in Keokuk County, Iowa
Education in Mahaska County, Iowa
Education in Monroe County, Iowa
Education in Wapello County, Iowa